Daniel «Dani» Hösli  is a former Swiss Air Force pilot. He was a professional officer who gained the rank of lieutenant colonel.

Career
In 1980, Daniel Hösli entered training as a military pilot and subsequently became a de Havilland Vampire pilot. 
In 1983 he transitioned to the Fliegerstaffel 1 (fighter squadron 1) at Dübendorf Air Base and became an F-5 Tiger pilot. From 1987 to 1998, Hösli was a member of the Patrouille Suisse.
In 1997 he transitioned to flying the F/A-18 Hornet.

From 2001 to mid-2015, he was commander of the Patrouille Suisse, carried the radio call sign 'Tiger Zero', and coordinated the flight program of the Patrouille Suisse from the ground. Hösli served as the shooting controller for aviator shooting at Axalp, known as 'Fliegerdemonstration Axalp', and as the Swiss Air Force fleet chief for the F-5 Tiger fleet.

In 2015, he was succeeded by Nils Hämmerli as Commander of the Patrouille Suisse, prior to his retirement.

Life
Daniel Hösli grew up in Bad Ragaz before attending middle school in Zurich. At age 17, Hösli earned a glider pilot license.
Daniel Hösli is married and has three sons.

Aircraft endorsements
Hösli trained as a combat pilot on Pilatus P-3 and de Havilland Vampire, and as a professional pilot flew the Swiss Air Force Pilatus PC-6 Porter, Pilatus PC-7, F-5E, F-5F, F/A-18C and F/A-18D.

Bibliography 
 Swissness  50 years Patrouille Suisse & 25 years PC-7 TEAM  
 Aridio Pellanda: Ueberwachungsgeschwader   30 Jahre Patrouille Suisse Max Huber, Kerzers  
"Patrouille Suisse Backstage"  
 Patrouille Suisse Booklet 2014
 Patrouille Suisse Booklet 2015
Air14 Booklet Historie Hommage Innovation
 Schweizer Luftwaffe Jahrespublikation 2012
 Schweizer Luftwaffe Jahrespublikation 2015
 Insider PS Fanclub 2014
 Armee.ch  2/2014

References

External links
Swiss National TV documentary on Daniel Hösli (2014)
Interview with Daniel Hösli on Swiss National Radio (2011)
Interview with Daniel Hösli on Private TV (2013)
Daniel Hösli on IMDB

Living people
1957 births
Swiss military officers
Swiss Air Force personnel